The Gran Premio Automobilistico di San Remo, commonly known as the San Remo Grand Prix, was a Grand Prix / Formula One and  motorcycle race held in the north-western coastal town of San Remo (Italy) from 1937 to 1972. The first Grand Prix was held in 1937 on a street circuit in the town of San Remo, known as the San Remo Circuit (Circuito di San Remo, official name: Circuito Stracittadino di San Remo) and from 1947 to 1972 on the Ospedaletti street circuit.

History
 1937. The first (non-championship) San Remo GP was held for Voiturette class racing. Maserati was the dominant manufacturer with 4CM and 6CM entries.
 1947. The 2nd edition of the San Remo Grand Prix was held for International Sport Cars. The event moved from San Remo to the Ospedaletti circuit.
 1948. The Ospedaletti circuit was reconfigured from the 2.62 km (1.63 m) 1947 version to a longer 3.38 km (2.100 m) circuit. First appearance of Formula One cars.
 1949–1951. Formula One continued to be the premier event until 1951.
 1952–1972. Grand Prix motorcycle racing including Sidecar events were held on an annual basis.
 1973–present. Historic and Club meets are held on a more infrequent schedule.

Results by year

San Remo Grand Prix Circuit history

San Remo Grand Prix - Notable Drivers
 Louis Chiron (1948-1951), Louis Rosier (1948, 1949), Raymond Sommer (1948-1950), Emmanuel de Graffenried (1949-1951)
 Peter Whitehead (1949-1951), José Froilán González (1950), Reg Parnell (1950, 1951), Stirling Moss (1951)

The motorsport history of San Remo includes the Ralley San Remo dating back to 1929.

References

External links
 Formula One WC and non-championship results The Formula One Archives
 San Remo Circuit (1937) on Google Maps (Historic Grand Prix Tracks)
 Ospedaletti Circuit (1948-1951) on Google Maps (Historic Formula 1 Tracks)

 
Pre-World Championship Grands Prix
Formula One non-championship races